Usman Ashik (born 17 February 1991) is an Indian footballer who plays for Royal Travels FC BLACK & WHITE KOZHIKODE. He is better known for playing in All India Sevens Football. He is often called as the King of Sevens football in India.

Career

Chirag United Kerala
The 2011-12 football year got off to a good start for Ashik, as he made his debut for Chirag United Club Kerala in the I-League against Salgaocar, where he provided a crucial assist to Anil Kumar which resulted in a huge draw to Chirag's early season relegation challenge.

Mohammedan SC
On 4 August 2016, Mohammedan SC, who will begin their campaign in the ongoing 2016/17 Calcutta Premier Division – A against Army XI on Sunday, have announced the signing of Usman from United Sports Club in a press conference held at Club Tent.

Career statistics

Club
Statistics accurate as of 22 January 2012

References

External links
 

Indian footballers
1991 births
Living people
I-League players
Chirag United Club Kerala players
United SC players
People from Ottapalam
Footballers from Kerala
India youth international footballers
Association football midfielders